Romaine Morrison (born 12 October 1995) is a Jamaican cricketer. He made his first-class debut for Jamaica in the 2017–18 Regional Four Day Competition on 26 October 2017. In October 2019, he was named in the Combined Campuses' squad for the 2019–20 Regional Super50 tournament. He made his List A debut on 6 November 2019, for Combined Campuses and Colleges in the 2019–20 Regional Super50 tournament.

References

External links
 

1995 births
Living people
Combined Campuses and Colleges cricketers
Jamaican cricketers
Jamaica cricketers
Place of birth missing (living people)